"Going, Going, Gone" is a song written by Bob DiPiero, John Scott Sherrill, and Steve Cropper. It was first recorded by American country music artist Bryan White on his 1994 self-titled debut album.

It was covered by American country music artist Neal McCoy and released in September 1996 as the second single from his album Neal McCoy. The song reached #35 on the Billboard Hot Country Singles & Tracks chart.

Chart performance

References

1994 songs
1996 singles
Bryan White songs
Neal McCoy songs
Songs written by Steve Cropper
Songs written by Bob DiPiero
Songs written by John Scott Sherrill
Song recordings produced by Barry Beckett